A by-election was held for the New South Wales Legislative Assembly seat of The Entrance on 18 January 1992 because the Court of Disputed Returns overturned the result of the 1991 The Entrance election. Bob Graham (Liberal) had been declared elected by 116 votes over Grant McBride (Labor). Justice Slattery in the Court of Disputed Returns held that more than 200 voters in The Entrance had been given ballot papers for the adjoining district of Gosford and that the poll was void.

Dates

Results

The Court of Disputed Returns overturned the result of the 1991 The Entrance election.

See also
Electoral results for the district of The Entrance
List of New South Wales state by-elections

References

New South Wales state by-elections
1992 elections in Australia
1990s in New South Wales